Line Jahr (born 16 January 1984 in Drammen) is a Norwegian ski jumper.

She came in ninth place in the 2009 World Championship in Liberec, and finished fourth at the 2005 Winter Universiade.

She made her debut in the Continental Cup, the highest level in women's ski jumping, in March 2004 with a fourth place in Park City. She has finished among the top three 17 times, with three wins and five second places.

She represents the club Vikersund IF.

References

1984 births
Living people
Sportspeople from Drammen
Norwegian female ski jumpers
Olympic ski jumpers of Norway
Ski jumpers at the 2014 Winter Olympics
FIS Nordic World Ski Championships medalists in ski jumping
21st-century Norwegian women